The men's tournament in volleyball at the 2008 Summer Olympics was the 12th edition of the event at the Summer Olympics, organized by the world's governing body, the FIVB, in conjunction with the IOC. It was held in Beijing, China from 10 to 24 August 2008.

The twelve competing teams were split equally into two pools of six teams. Each team played all other teams in their pool with the winning team gaining 2 points and the losing side 1 point. The top four teams from each pool progressed through to the quarterfinals. The rest of the tournament was a single-elimination bracket, with a bronze medal match held between the two semifinal losers.

A total of 38 matches were played: 15 in each group, 4 quarterfinals, 2 semifinals, 1 bronze medal match, and 1 gold medal match.

Qualification

Pools composition
Teams were seeded following the serpentine system according to their FIVB World Ranking as of 3 December 2007. FIVB reserved the right to seed the hosts as head of pool A regardless of the World Ranking. Rankings are shown in brackets except the hosts who ranked 21st.

Rosters

Venues

Preliminary round
All times are China Standard Time (UTC+08:00).
The top four teams in each pool qualified for the quarterfinals.

Pool A

Pool B

Final round
All times are China Standard Time (UTC+08:00).
The first ranked teams of both pools played against the fourth ranked teams of the other pool. The second ranked teams faced the second or third ranked teams of the other pool, determined by drawing of lots. The drawing of lots was held after the last match in the preliminary round.

Quarterfinals

Semifinals

Bronze medal match

Gold medal match

Final standing

Medalists

Awards

Most Valuable Player
 Clayton Stanley
Best Scorer
 Clayton Stanley
Best Spiker
 Sebastian Świderski
Best Blocker
 Gustavo Endres
Best Server
 Clayton Stanley
Best Digger
 Aleksey Verbov
Best Setter
 Paweł Zagumny
Best Receiver
 Michał Winiarski
Best Libero
 Mirko Corsano

References

External links
Official website
Final Standing
Awards
Statistics
Results at Todor66.com
Results at Sports123.com

O
Men's tournament
Men's events at the 2008 Summer Olympics